Douglas Geers is an American composer, and the founder of the Spark Festival.

Career
Geers is an associate professor of music composition and director of the Brooklyn College Center for Computer Music (BC-CCM) at the City University of New York, Brooklyn College (USA). He had been a professor of music at the University of Minnesota (Minneapolis, USA), where he founded the Spark Festival of Electronic Music and Arts and was its Director from 2003-2009. Geers also is a member of the Electric Music Collective and the electroacoustic band, Sønreel.

Education
Geers received a B.A. in English and Music from Xavier University, a M.A. in Music from the University of Cincinnati College-Conservatory of Music and a D.M.A. from Columbia University in 2002. From 2000 to 2001, he completed a one-year research/composition residency at the Norwegian Center for Music in Technology and the Arts in Oslo, Norway. His teachers include Fred Lerdahl, Tristan Murail, Brad Garton, Jonathan Kramer, George Edwards, Allen Sapp (composer), Frederick Bianchi, and Darrell Handel.

Selected works
Inanna (2009) multimedia theater
Calling (2008) opera
Sweep (2008) for PLOrk with violin and percussion
Laugh Perfumes (2006) violin concerto 
Tremor Transducer (2004) for five instruments and computer
Memory Dust (2003) for big band and computer
Gilgamesh (2002) multimedia concerto/theater 
Enkidu (2001) for violin and computer 
Reality House (1998) for chamber septet
Ripples (1997) electroacoustic music

Recordings
 Love Paint
 Music for Fish
 60x60 2006
 SEAMUS 20th Anniversary Electroclips
 60x60 2005
 Defiant (Electric Music Collective) 
 Incandescence (Electric Music Collective)
 60x60
 Sonic Circuits IX
 Music from SEAMUS, volume ten

References

External links
Douglas Geers' website
Brooklyn College Center for Computer Music
College Conservatory of Music

Year of birth missing (living people)
21st-century classical composers
20th-century classical composers
American electronic musicians
Brooklyn College faculty
American male classical composers
American classical composers
Living people
Columbia University School of the Arts alumni
21st-century American composers
University of Cincinnati – College-Conservatory of Music alumni
20th-century American composers
20th-century American male musicians
21st-century American male musicians